Lieutenant General The Hon. Sir William Edward Rous  (23 February 1939 – 25 May 1999) was a British Army officer who served as Quartermaster-General to the Forces.

Early life and education

Rous was the second son of Hon. Keith Rous and Pamela Catherine Mabell Kay-Shuttleworth, only daughter of Capt. Hon. Edward James Kay-Shuttleworth (1890–1917). His mother was the granddaughter of Ughtred Kay-Shuttleworth, 1st Baron Shuttleworth and sister of the 4th Baron.

He had an elder brother, Keith Rous, later the 6th Earl of Stradbroke.

His parents divorced in 1940. His father remarried, in 1943, to April Mary Asquith, daughter of Brig-Gen. Hon. Arthur Asquith, and had one more son and four daughters. He was educated at Harrow School and Royal Military Academy Sandhurst.

In 1983, his father succeeded his elder brother, John Rous, 4th Earl of Stradbroke, as the 5th Earl of Stradbroke but lived only four days as earl (14 July 1983 – 18 July 1983) before his own death.

Military career
Rous was commissioned into the Coldstream Guards in 1959.

He was appointed General Officer Commanding 4th Armoured Division in 1987 and then selected to be Commandant of the Staff College, Camberley in 1989.

In 1991, he was appointed Military Secretary and in 1994 he went on to be Quartermaster-General to the Forces. He retired in 1996.

He was also Colonel of the Coldstream Guards.

Personal life
In 1970, Rous married Rosemary Persse, only child of Maj. Jocelyn Arthur Persse, and Joan Shirley (later Lady Carew Pole). They had two sons: James Anthony Edward (born 1972) and Richard William Jocelyn (born 1975).

In 1998, he was appointed as Chairman of the British Greyhound Racing Board but resigned in 1999 following ill health.

In retirement, he was Chairman of Kingston Hospital. He died of cancer in May 1999 and the cancer unit at the hospital is named after him.

References

|-

|-
 

|-

|-

 

|-

1939 births
1999 deaths
Military personnel from Norfolk
People educated at Harrow School
Graduates of the Royal Military Academy Sandhurst
Knights Commander of the Order of the Bath
Officers of the Order of the British Empire
British Army lieutenant generals
Coldstream Guards officers
Younger sons of earls
Deaths from cancer in England
Commandants of the Staff College, Camberley
People in greyhound racing